All Kneel is the second studio album by American alternative rock band Katastrophy Wife. It had favorable reviews and had three singles and videos released from the album. A limited edition blue vinyl reissue was released on Record Store Day 2014 for its 10th anniversary.

Reception
Drowned In Sound said 'All Kneel sounds anything but a slackening of the pace. Guitars roar menacingly through the speakers, Kat vocals plead and scream and bellow in all the correct measures...'.

Track listing
All songs written by Kat Bjelland.

Personnel
Katastrophy Wife
Kat Bjelland - vocals, guitar
Andrew Parker - bass
Darren Donovan - drums
Guest musicians
Carina Round - additional vocals

References

External links 

 

2004 albums